St. Mary's Church of the Assumption is a historic church on FM 1295 in Praha, Texas.

It was built in 1895 and added to the National Register of Historic Places in 1983. Gottfried Flury, a Swiss-born artist from Moulton, TX, painted much of the interior. Using a combination of stenciling, infill painting, and freehand techniques, Flury's trompe-l'œil designs mimic stone vaults and Gothic tracery reminiscent of central European models. The ornate polychrome interior of St. Mary's Church of the Assumption is typical of the so-called "Painted Churches of Texas" constructed by immigrants who settled in the region in the nineteenth century.

Plan
The church has a rectangular plan consisting of a five-bay nave with side aisles terminated by a polygonal apse.

Gallery

See also

National Register of Historic Places listings in Fayette County, Texas

Notes

Further reading
 Baker, T. Lindsay. Ghost Towns of Texas. Norman: University of Oklahoma Press, 1991.
 Christensen, Carl J., and Pixie Christensen. Lone Star Steeples: Historic Places of Worship in Texas. College Station: Texas A&M University Press, 2016.
 Koenig, Jon Todd. Fayette County. Charleston, S.C.: Arcadia Pub, 2011.

External links

Roman Catholic churches in Texas
Churches on the National Register of Historic Places in Texas
Gothic Revival church buildings in Texas
Roman Catholic churches completed in 1895
19th-century Roman Catholic church buildings in the United States
Churches in Fayette County, Texas
National Register of Historic Places in Fayette County, Texas